Juan Antonio Cebrián (1965–2007) was a Spanish journalist, writer and broadcaster.  He is most recognized for his works: Night Shift and The Compass Rose.

References

1965 births
2007 deaths
People from Albacete
20th-century Spanish journalists